Simone D'Uffizi (born 15 September 2004) is an Italian professional footballer who plays for  club Viterbese.

Career 
Simone D'Uffizi came trough the youth ranks of AS Lodigiani in Rome, making his senior debut on loan with their neighbour of Nuova Florida in Serie D on the 14 April 2021.

At the end of the season, he was transferred to the US Viterbese, signing a 3 years contract with the club of Viterbo.

Soon included in the first team squad of the Serie C team, D'Uffizi made his professional debut for the Viterbese on 3 November 2021, replacing Niccolò Ricchi during a 1–0 away Coppa Serie C win against Ancona.

In March 2022, he was loaned to SPAL for the Torneo di Viareggio, scoring two goals as his team reached the round of 16.

References

External links

2004 births
Living people
Footballers from Rome
Italian footballers
Association football midfielders
Serie C players
U.S. Viterbese 1908 players